The Valle de Ángeles Group is a geologic group in Honduras. It preserves fossils such as ornithopod and iguanodontid dinosaurs dating back to the Late Albian to Early Turonian stages of the Cretaceous period.

See also 
 List of fossiliferous stratigraphic units in Honduras

References

Further reading 
 
 G. S. Horne, M. G. Atwood, and A. P. King. 1974. Stratigraphy, sedimentology, and paleoenvironment of Esquias Formation of Honduras. The American Association of Petroleum Geologists Bulletin 58(2):176-188
 
 Weishampel, David B.; Dodson, Peter; and Osmólska, Halszka (eds.): The Dinosauria, 2nd, Berkeley: University of California Press. 861 pp. 

Geologic groups of North America
Geologic formations of Honduras
Albian Stage
Cenomanian Stage
Turonian Stage
Sandstone formations
Shale formations
Fluvial deposits
Lacustrine deposits
Paleontology in Honduras
Formations
Formations